Komodo is the name of two fictional characters appearing in American comic books published by Marvel Comics. Komodo was created by Dan Slott and Stefano Caselli. The character's first appearance was in Avengers: The Initiative #1.

Publication history

Komodo was created by writer Dan Slott and artist Stefano Caselli, and first appeared in Avengers: The Initiative #1  (June 2007).

Komodo was one of the feature characters in the 2011 six-issue limited series Fear Itself: Youth in Revolt.

Fictional character biography

New Men
The first Komodo is one of the New Men, creatures evolved by the High Evolutionary from a lizard. He accompanied the High Evolutionary's incarnation of the Ani-Men on their clean-up mission at the Jackal's laboratory and fought the Scarlet Spider. Later, he fought Caiman of the Cult of the Jackal when their members infiltrated the High Evolutionary's citadel, but the High Evolutionary brought the fight to an end.

Komodo (Melati Kusuma)

The second Komodo is a female trainee for the Fifty State Initiative.

Melati Kusuma is a former graduate student of Dr. Curt Connors. She stole Connors' regenerative  Lizard Formula, modified it to her own DNA and administered it to herself.

Connors later registered her for the Initiative and she was sent to Camp Hammond. At the camp she was victim of a training accident; her arm was blown off by Armory, whose powers were out of control. The arm regenerates in moments. During their "field trip" to Texas to save the President from HYDRA she performed very well, and was activated for field work. She worked with War Machine in an attempt to use S.P.I.N. tech to take away Spider-Man's powers, just as had been done to She-Hulk. Spider-Man called her a "dollar-store version of the Lizard" and convinced her she would fail even as she had him pinned down, warning her that her powers would be taken away when he defeated her, which he does by firing a blast of webbing into her face. Komodo was seen begging War Machine not to have her powers removed as she considers her former human identity to be a nobody. She revealed that her code-name is taken from an animal specific to certain islands in Indonesia and her name is commonly used by Indonesians (Melati means jasmine, Kusuma means flower in Javanese language).

During World War Hulk, when a number of Komodo's teammates broke rank to go and fight the Hulk, Komodo chose to follow orders and stay put. Komodo struck up a relationship with fellow trainee Hardball even going as far as to show him her true form, which was missing both legs below the knee. Intentionally this time; he had seen it before when she lost control while asleep. This was against Initiative secret identity rules but Hardball reassured his superior officers that no trouble would result, she was 'just a girl'. In this incident, angles prevented the reader from seeing Komodo's legs.

While fighting KIA, he used his Tactigon to infect her with poison so potent that it would kill her before she could regenerate. Hardball uses his power to sever her poisoned legs, stopping the poison before it can travel to the rest of her body. Although he manages to save her, this solution is especially painful for her as she is a former amputee who lost her legs once before.

When Komodo completed her Initiative training, she was assigned to Arizona, as a part  of the Desert Stars team. She later appears with the rest of her new team during the Secret Invasion. When the new 3-D Man and the Skrull Kill Krew arrive and identify team member the Blacksmith as a Skrull, Komodo helps them fight and kill the Skrull infiltrator. As the rest of the Desert Stars team was incapacitated during the fight, Komodo leaves with the 3-D Man and the Skull Kill Krew to travel to Nevada to help Hardball's team and find the Skrull infiltrators on the other Initiative teams.

Hardball later becomes the new leader of HYDRA and leaves the Initiative. It was also revealed that she lost her legs in a car accident, "Just a stupid kid driving too fast". Komodo insists on accompanying the Shadow Initiative to take down Hardball in Madripoor. When the group arrive, Komodo is depowered when Hardball fires a S.P.I.N. tech dart at her, and she is abandoned by her retreating teammates. Komodo is held in a HYDRA cell, and later freed by the returning Shadow Initiative.

Komodo joins up with a new version of the Shadow Initiative in order to retake the  Negative Zone prison where Hardball was incarcerated, as it had been conquered by aliens. During the battle, Komodo allows herself to be injured. This spurs Dragon Man into the battle, as the primitive entity had developed romantic feelings for Komodo. The Shadow Initiative retakes the prison, albeit with the loss of several new members; the survivors realize that Osborn intended for the team to be expendable.

Komodo later quits the Shadow Initiative when she learns that Hardball has joined the team. The price for leaving (as laid out by Initiative operative Taskmaster) is to have S.P.I.N. tech take away her powers. She chooses to have her powers removed rather than remain on the same team with Hardball, and is next seen in human form in a wheelchair with no legs. She then joins up with the Avengers Resistance to help them rescue Night Thrasher.

In the aftermath of Siege, Komodo confronts Baron Von Blitzschlag in an effort to prevent  him from destroying incriminating evidence against himself and Norman Osborn. Before shooting Von Blitzschlag, Cloud 9 and Hardball appear and inject Komodo, neutralizing the S.P.I.N. tech in her bloodstream and restoring her powers and physical appearance.

Komodo is later invited to prom night at the Avengers Academy where she dances with Reptil. Komodo was shocked at the fact that Reptil is still in his adult body following the fight against Korvac and vows to make Tigra pay for this.

During  the Fear Itself storyline, Komodo appears at a meeting held by Prodigy regarding magical hammers that have crashed into the earth.

Komodo  later appears amongst the heroes on Jeremy Briggs' side.

Powers and abilities
The first Komodo possesses a strong, scaly hide, enhanced strength, the ability to breathe flame, and a powerful tail which he can use in combat. While in Wundagore, he flew an Atomic Steed.

The second Komodo possesses an accelerated healing factor derived from the same serum created by Dr. Curt Connors that turned him into the Lizard. The serum was created from lizard DNA in an attempt to create a serum capable of granting humans the regenerative properties of lizards. The extent of her healing factor is unknown, but it is shown she is able to regenerate lost limbs in seconds. She also possesses razor-sharp claws on each of her fingers. Unlike Connors she maintains control of her human consciousness when she is in her lizard form, and has the ability to control transformations between human and lizard forms. This is a result of her being able to perfect the formula to her DNA.  Komodo also appears to have superhuman strength, stamina, reflexes, and agility. Komodo has demonstrated genius in chemistry and genetics.

References

Characters created by Dan Slott
Comics characters introduced in 2007
Fictional amputees
Fictional reptilians
Marvel Comics characters with accelerated healing
Marvel Comics characters with superhuman strength
Marvel Comics female superheroes
Marvel Comics mutates
Marvel Comics superheroes